Sandro Hit (1993 – August 2021) was an Oldenburg stallion that was successful in dressage competition and as a sire of numerous top foals.

In 1999, Sandro Hit became the six-year-old dressage horse World Champion, and won the German Federal Championships in Warendorf. He was also named the Best Young Stallion of 2000.

Progeny

Ten licensed sons came out of his first foal crop alone, and his daughter, Poetin 2, was the winner of the 3 year old mare and gelding section at the German Federal Championships in 2000, after which she sold for a record 2.5 million euros. In 2001, 5 of the top 10 foals in Germany were by Sandro Hit, including a Federal Champion and two Vice Champions. One of his progeny, Show Star, was the National Young Horse Champion in 2001 and a Vice-Champion in 2002. In 2002, he produced Sir Wilson and Stedinger, two Champion stallions.  Sandro Hit has the highest index in Germany for his descendant's performance, at 153, and also the highest security rating at 88%.

Many of his progeny have sold for record prices. In 2000, his filly, Starlett, sold for DM 140,000, making her the top priced broodmare and top priced Schatzinsel at the Vechta spring auction in 2000.  In the 2002 Vechta spring auction, his son, Super Star, sold for over 250,000 euros. In 2003, his filly, Sandritana Olympia was the most expensive foal in the Netherlands when she sold for 31,000 euros. In 2006, a Sandro Hit foal sold for a record 103,000 euros at the Verden Elite Hanoverian Mare and Foal sale.

One of his daughters Hot Summer won a dressage tournament at the age of 7 with 9.8 points.

Sandro Hit was approved for breeding by the Oldenburg, Hanoverian, Rhinelander and Westphalian studbooks, along with all southern German, Swedish, Danish, and French breeding associations.

Pedigree

References

Dressage horses
1993 animal births
2021 animal deaths